Saltykovo is a rural locality (a village) in Vereshchaginsky District, Perm Krai, Russia. The population was 110 as of 2010.

Geography 
Saltykovo is located 28 km north of Vereshchagino (the district's administrative centre) by road. Yelino is the nearest rural locality.

References 

Rural localities in Vereshchaginsky District